Grange stone circle (Lios na Gráinsí or Fort of the Grange) is a stone circle in County Limerick, Ireland. It is located 300m west of Lough Gur, 4 km north of Bruff. The Limerick-Kilmallock road is nearby.

Features

The largest stone is Rannach Chruim Duibh (Crom Dubh's Division)  and is over 4m high and weighs 40 tonnes. The entrance of the circle is aligned with the rising sun at the Summer Solstice.

A short distance to the north-north east of the main stone circle, is a second smaller circle, also constructed of large stones. To the north of this is a large leaning standing stone.

References

Stone circles in Ireland
Archaeological sites in County Limerick